"Breakout" is a song by British band Swing Out Sister. It was released in 1986 as the second single from their debut album It's Better to Travel.

The single reached the number four position in the UK in the autumn of 1986, and rose to number six on the Billboard Hot 100 in the US and number one on the Adult Contemporary in the US in 1987. The song also resulted in a Grammy Award nomination for Best Pop Vocal Performance by a Duo or Group.

Background
The single was written and performed while the group was still a trio. It was one of their biggest hits, and the song most closely associated with the act. In the US, "Breakout" remains a staple of adult contemporary and smooth jazz radio station playlists.

Singer Corinne Drewery wrote the song while recovering from a fractured skull from an equestrian accident. Swing Out Sister had a two-song deal with Mercury Records, and the first song failed to impact the charts. Mercury said the band had to have the second demo in by the next Monday morning or risk being dropped, causing the band to compose "Breakout" under stress. This influenced the lyrics, as well as Drewery's desire to quit her day job as a fashion designer and be a singer. The bass line was inspired by the 1986 FIFA World Cup TV theme in Britain.

Music video
The music video for "Breakout" features lead singer Corinne Drewery as a fashion designer, who with the assistance of the other two band members designs and makes her own dress, and later makes a successful runway debut, modelling the garment. There are two versions of this video; the official monochrome version and the alternate color version.The video was directed by Nick Willing.

Chart performance

Weekly charts

Year-end charts

See also
List of number-one adult contemporary singles of 1987 (U.S.)

References

1986 singles
1986 songs
Mercury Records singles
Songs written by Andy Connell
Songs written by Corinne Drewery
Songs written by Martin Jackson
Swing Out Sister songs